Tom Rolt is a narrow gauge steam locomotive constructed by the Talyllyn Railway, using parts from an Andrew Barclay locomotive built in 1949 for Bord na Móna.

History

Bord na Móna
The engine began life working for the Bord na Móna. This is a semi-state company in Ireland, created by the Turf Development Act, 1946. The company is responsible for the mechanised harvesting of peat, primarily in the Midlands of Ireland. This company uses narrow gauge railways to carry vast amounts of peat.

It was one of three  gauge  well tank locomotives built by Andrew Barclay Sons & Co. in 1949; initially numbered 1 to 3; they were later renumbered 43 to 45.

Intended to burn peat, the engines did not perform well and were put into storage after only a few years of work.

Talyllyn Railway 

As passenger numbers continued to grow during the late 1960s, the Talyllyn Railway Preservation Society realised that further motive power was needed, especially as the rebuilt No. 1, Talyllyn was not performing well. However, as the  gauge of the Talyllyn Railway was so unusual they could not buy an engine with the correct gauge, so would either have to buy and re-gauge an engine or else make a new engine. In 1969 the Talyllyn Railway purchased an 0-4-0 well tank engine from Bord na Móna, unofficially named Irish Pete, in order to create the new locomotive they needed.

The new engine was built in 1991 at Pendre works on the Talyllyn Railway. The frames, boiler, driving wheels, cylinders and other parts of the  engine from Bord na Móna were used.

Tom Rolt is running in the standard Talyllyn Railway livery of deep bronze green lined with black borders and yellow lining.

In fiction 
The character Ivo Hugh in The Railway Series books is based on Tom Rolt. Ivo Hugh appears in New Little Engine.

References

Bibliography

 
 
 
 

Talyllyn Railway locomotives
Individual locomotives of Great Britain
Preserved narrow gauge steam locomotives of Great Britain
0-4-2T locomotives
Railway locomotives introduced in 1991